Timothy Binkley (born Timothy Glenn Binkley on September 14, 1943, in Baltimore, MD), is an American philosopher, artist, and teacher, known for his radical writings about conceptual art and aesthetics, as well as several essays that help define computer art. He is also known for his interactive art installations.

Biography

Timothy Binkley studied mathematics at University of Colorado at Boulder, earning a B.A. (1965) and an M.A. (1966). His PhD in philosophy, from University of Texas at Austin (1970), explored Ludwig Wittgenstein's use of language.

Binkley has lectured and taught at several colleges and universities in the United States, most notably at School of Visual Arts where he initiated the MFA Computer Art program, the first of its kind in the country. In 1992, he founded the New York Digital Salon, an international exhibition of computer art.

He has exhibited his interactive art in the United States, Europe, South America, and Asia.

Philosophy

Binkley postulates that twentieth-century art is a strongly self-critical discipline, which creates ideas free of traditional piece-specifying conventions including aesthetic parameters and qualities. The artwork is a piece, and a piece isn't necessarily an aesthetic object—or an object at all. Binkley states that anything that can be thought about or referred to can be labeled an artwork by an artist.

Binkley argues that the computer is neither a medium nor a tool, since both media and tools have inherent characteristics that can be explored through an artist's gestures or physical events for mark-making. Instead, the computer is a chameleon-like or even promiscuous assistant, whose services can be applied to any number of tasks and whose capabilities can be defined endlessly from application to application. Binkley refers to the computer as a non-specific technology and an incorporeal metamedium. Yet the computer contains phenomena not found in other media: namely, a conceptual space where symbolic content can be modified using mathematical abstractions. The notion of an “original” and its consequent value are considered irrelevant, obsolete, or inapplicable to computer art.

Binkley's philosophy extends beyond art and aesthetics to culture itself, whose foundations he believes we are overhauling through our involvement with computers.

Bibliography

Books
 Symmetry Studio: Computer-Aided Surface Design. New York: Van Nostrand Reinhold, 1992. With John F. Simon Jr. Includes surface design software on CD.
 Wittgenstein's Language. The Hague: Martinus Nijhoff, 1973.

Selected articles
 “A Philosophy of Computer Art by Lopes, Dominic McIver”, Journal of Aesthetics and Art Criticism 68(4), (2010): 409–411.
 "Autonomous Creations: Birthing Intelligent Agents", Leonardo, 31(5), Sixth Annual New York Digital Salon, (1998): 333–336.
 "The Vitality of Digital Creation", The Journal of Aesthetics and Art Criticism, 55(2), Perspectives on the Arts and Technology. (Spring, 1997): 107–116.
 "Computer Art" and "Digital Media", Encyclopedia of Aesthetics, New York: Oxford University Press, 1998. 1:412–414, 2:47–50.
 “Transparent Technology: The Swan Song of Electronics", Leonardo, 28(5), Special Issue "The Third Annual New York Digital Salon" (1995): 427–432.
 "Creating Symmetric Patterns with Objects and Lists", Symmetry: Culture and Science, 6(1), (1995).
 "Refiguring Culture", Future Visions: New Technologies of the Screen, London: British Film Institute Publications, (1993): 90–122.
 "Postmodern Torrents", Millennium Film Journal, 23/24 (Winter 1990–91): 130–141.
 "The Computer is Not a Medium", Philosophic Exchange (Fall/Winter, 1988/89). Reprinted in EDB & kunstfag, Rapport Nr. 48, NAVFs EDB-Senter for Humanistisk Forskning.  Translated as "L'ordinateur n'est pas un médium", Esthétique des arts médiatiques, Sainte-Foy, Québec: Presses de l'Université du Québec, 1995.
 "Computed Space", National Computer Graphics Association Conference Proceedings, (1987): 643–652.
 "Piece: Contra Aesthetics", Philosophy Looks at the Arts: Contemporary Readings in Aesthetics, 3rd Ed., edited by Joseph Margolis, (Philadelphia: Temple University Press, 1987). Originally published in The Journal of Aesthetics and Art Criticism,  35(3), (Spring 1977): 265–277. A French translation appeared in Poétique 79 (Septembre, 1989) and has been collected in Esthétique et Poétique, edited by Gérard Genette, (Paris: Éditions du Seuil, 1992).   Also anthologized in The Philosophy of the Visual Arts, edited by Philip Alperson (New York: Oxford University Press, 1990), and A Question of Art, edited by Benjamin F. Ward, (Florence, KY: Brenael Publishing, 1994).
 "Conceptual Art:  Appearance and Reality", Art In Culture, 1, edited by A. Balis, L. Aagaard-Mogensen, R. Pinxten, F. Vandamme (Ghent, Belgium: Communication & Cognition Publishers, 1985).  Proceedings of the Ghent colloquium "Art in Culture."
"Deciding About Art", Culture and Art, edited by Lars Aagaard-Mogensen (Atlantic Highlands, N.J.: Humanities Press, 1976).

Exhibitions
 Rest Rooms, interactive telecommunications installation with video-conferenced computers, exhibited at SIGGRAPH ’94 in Orlando, FL., Wexner Center for the Arts in Columbus, OH (April 1–30, 1995), Schloss Agathenberg in Germany (September 24 – November 26, 1995), Schloß Arolsen in Germany (February 24 – April 14, 1996).
 Books of Change, interactive computer installation exhibited in "Tomorrow's Realities", SIGGRAPH 1994. Included in the "Multimedia Playground" at the Exploratorium in San Francisco (February 12 – March 13, 1994).  Exhibited at the Hong Kong Arts Centre in Hong Kong (June 26–29, 1994), the Central Academy of Art and Design in Beijing (July 4–8, 1994), and Camera Obscura in Tel Aviv (October 16–20, 1994).
 Watch Yourself, interactive computer installation. Included in "Tomorrow's Realities" exhibit at SIGGRAPH '91 in Las Vegas (July 29 – August 2, 1991). Exhibited at the National Conference on Computing and Values, New Haven (August 12–16, 1991). Accepted for Ars Electronica in Linz, Austria (1992).  Exhibited at Videobrasil International Videofestival in São Paulo (September 21–27, 1992). Exhibited at Digital Jambalaya in New York City (November 16 – December 1, 1992) in conjunction with the international TRIP '92 event.  Demonstration tape included on Computer Graphics Access '89-'92 videodisks (Bunkensha: Tokyo, 1992); Electronic Dictionary videodisks (G.R.A.M.: Montréal, 1993).  Exhibited at Images du Futur in Montréal (May 13 – September 19, 1993).  Exhibited at Vidéoformes in France (April 6–23, 1994).  Shown at the Solomon R. Guggenheim Museum in New York City (June 2, 1994).   Included in "Art for the End of the Century: Art and Technology" at the Reading Public Museum (July 23, 1995 – January 1, 1996).  Exhibited at ciberfestival 96 in Lisbon, Portugal (February 9 – March 17, 1996).  Permanent installation at Tempozan Contemporary Museum in Osaka, Japan (opened in September 1996).

Personal life and family
Binkley is married to artist and author Sonya Shannon and has a daughter Shelley Binkley, M.D., from a previous marriage to Sue Binkley Tatem.

References

1943 births
20th-century American male artists
21st-century American artists
21st-century American historians
21st-century American male artists
21st-century American philosophers
American digital artists
American installation artists
American multimedia artists
Artists from Baltimore
Artists from Maryland
Digital media educators
Living people
Mass media theorists
New media artists
Philosophers from Maryland
Philosophers of art
Philosophy writers
School of Visual Arts faculty
Scientists from Baltimore
Scientists from Maryland
Social philosophers
Sociologists of art
Trope theorists
University of Colorado Boulder alumni
University of Texas at Austin alumni
Wittgensteinian philosophers
Writers about activism and social change
Writers from Baltimore
Writers from Maryland